Bluebird of Happiness is the fifth studio album by the American R&B singer Tamar Braxton, released on September 29, 2017, by LoganLand Records and Entertainment One. The album was preceded by the release of two singles: "My Man" followed by "Blind".

The album was a success, reaching the top of the Billboard Independent chart and #5 on the Us Top Albums Sales chart.

Background and release

On January 17, 2017, Braxton said during an interview with Hollywood Today regarding her upcoming fifth studio album "this album for me is so personal and so amazing and I get to work with Rodney Jerkins". On April 27, 2017, "My Man" was released as the lead single from the album. The song was also introduced on an episode of Braxton Family Values in which Braxton stars. On September 6, 2017, Braxton announced on her social media the title of her upcoming fifth studio album, Bluebird of Happiness, along with the cover art. She said,d "Pre-order and official release date will be revealed before you know it." On September 8, 2017, the track listing and release date for the album were revealed. On September 14, 2017, Braxton announced that "Bluebird of Happiness" would be her final studio album. However, as of 2020, Braxton has since stated that she will record a sixth studio album, as she found her love for music again.

Promotion
"My Man" was released as the album's lead single on April 27, 2017. The song peaked at number 3 on the Adult R&B Songs chart, number 21 on the Hot R&B Songs chart and number 19 on the Hot R&B/Hip-Hop Airplay chart. The music video was released on June 25, 2017. "Pick Me Up" was released as a promotional single.

"Blind" was released as the album's second single on September 22, 2017. It peaked at number 29 on the Adult R&B Songs chart.

On November 23, 2018, one year after the release, she released the music video of "The Makings of You" and on November 26, 2018, she released the music video of "Wanna Love You Boy". However, neither song are available as an official single on iTunes or Amazon.

Commercial performance
In the United States, the album reached #1 at the Billboard independent chart  and #5 on the US Top Albums Sales chart.

The album debuted and peaked at number 14 on the Billboard 200, selling over 23,000 copies in its first. Of those 23,000 copies, over 19,000 of them were pure sales.

Track listing

Sample credits
 "Wanna Love You Boy" contains an interpolation of "Wanna Love You Girl", written by Robin Thicke & Pharrell Williams.
 "Run Run" contains elements of "Bam Bam", performed by Sister Nancy.
 "Hol' Up" contains an interpolation of The Isley Brothers' song "Shout", written by O'Kelly Isley, Ronald Isley and Rudolph Isley.
 "The Makings of You" contains an interpolation of Gladys Knight & The Pips' cover of Curtis Mayfield's "The Makings of You".
 "Blind" contains an interpolation of the Etta James song "I'd Rather Go Blind", written by Billy Foster & Ellington Jordan.
 "Pick Me Up" contains an interpolation of the Evelyn "Champagne" King song "Love Come Down", written by Michael Jones.

Charts

Release history

References

2017 albums
Tamar Braxton albums
Hip hop soul albums